Petrus Leonardus Rijke (11 July 1812 – 7 April 1899) was a Dutch physicist, and a professor in experimental physics at the University of Leiden. Rijke spent his scientific career exploring the physics of electricity, and is known for the Rijke tube. On 1 July 1852 he married Johanna Hamaker. They had 6 sons and 6 daughters.

Early years and education
Rijke was born in Hemmen, (now Overbetuwe municipality), Gelderland.  His father, Dirk Rijke, was a pastor. His mother was Elisabeth Pieternella Beausar.

From 1830 Rijke studied physics under  at the University of Leiden, where he obtained his Ph.D. in 1836. The title of his Ph.D. thesis was "De origine electricitatis voltaicae".

Academic career
In 1835 he was appointed professor of physics at the Royal Athenaeum in Maastricht. In 1845 he became extraordinary professor and in 1854 he was promoted to full professor of physics at the University of Leiden.

There he started a physics laboratory with a large collection of scientific instruments. His most important students were H.A. Lorentz and J.D. van der Waals. He retired in 1882, and was succeeded by Heike Kamerlingh Onnes as professor of experimental physics at the University of Leiden.

Rijke became a member of the Royal Netherlands Academy of Arts and Sciences in 1863.

Publications

See also

 Rijke tube

References

External links
 H.A.M. Snelders, Rijke, Petrus Leonardus (1812-1899), in Biografisch Woordenboek van Nederland. (In Dutch).
 List of Ph.D. students of Pieter Rijke
 Vasco Verlaan, P.L. Rijke: Een Bron van degelijkheid., master's thesis, University of Utrecht, 2003 (In Dutch).
 Ph.D. family tree of Pieter Rijke
 

1812 births
1899 deaths
People from Overbetuwe
19th-century Dutch physicists
Academic staff of Leiden University
Leiden University alumni
Members of the Royal Netherlands Academy of Arts and Sciences